Liudmila Garajànskaia (born 17 June 1970) is a Belarusian cyclist. She competed in the women's point race at the 1996 Summer Olympics.

References

1970 births
Living people
Belarusian female cyclists
Olympic cyclists of Belarus
Cyclists at the 1996 Summer Olympics
Place of birth missing (living people)